Tahincioğlu is a Turkish surname. Notable people with the surname include:

 Jason Tahincioğlu (born 1983), Turkish racing driver
 Mümtaz Tahincioğlu (born 1952), Turkish racing driver

Turkish-language surnames